Octaethylporphyrin (H2OEP) is an organic compound that is a relative of naturally occurring heme pigments.  The compound is used in the preparation of models for the prosthetic group in heme proteins.  It is a dark purple solid that is soluble in organic solvents.  As its conjugate base OEP2-, it forms a range of transition metal porphyrin complexes. When treated with ferric chloride in hot acetic acid solution, it gives the square pyramidal complex Fe(OEP)Cl.  It also forms the square planar complexes Ni(OEP) and Cu(OEP).

Contrast with other porphyrins
Unlike complexes of the naturally occurring porphyrins, OEP complexes have four-fold symmetry, which simplifies spectroscopic analysis.  In contrast to tetraphenylporphyrin and related analogues, H2OEP features unprotected meso positions.  In this way, it is a more accurate model for naturally occurring porphyrins.

Synthesis
H2OEP is prepared by condensation of 3,4-diethylpyrrole with formaldehyde.

References

Porphyrins